The 2020 FC Ordabasy season was the 18th successive season that the club played in the Kazakhstan Premier League, the highest tier of association football in Kazakhstan.

Season events
On 13 March, the Football Federation of Kazakhstan announced all league fixtures would be played behind closed doors for the foreseeable future due to the COVID-19 pandemic. On 16 March the Football Federation of Kazakhstan suspended all football until 15 April.

On 26 July, it was announced that the league would resume on 1 July, with no fans being permitted to watch the games. The league was suspended for a second time on 3 July, for an initial two weeks, due to an increase in COVID-19 cases in the country.

Squad

Out on loan

Transfers

In

Out

Loans out

Released

Friendlies

Competitions

Premier League

Results summary

Results by round

Results

League table

Kazakhstan Cup

UEFA Europa League

Qualifying rounds

Squad statistics

Appearances and goals

|-
|colspan="14"|Players away from Ordabasy on loan:
|-
|colspan="14"|Players who left Ordabasy during the season:

|}

Goal scorers

Clean sheets

Disciplinary record

References

External links

FC Ordabasy seasons
Ordabasy
Ordabasy